The Philippine peso sign (₱) is the currency symbol used for the Philippine peso, the official currency of the Philippines. The symbol resembles a Latin letter P with two horizontal strokes. It differs from the currency symbol used for the peso in Latin America, which is "$".

History
The Philippine peso sign was introduced by Executive Order No. 66 of the United States colonial government on 3 August 1903. The sign, in capitalized Roman letter P with two parallel lines "passing through and extending slightly beyond loop at right angle to shaft or stem", was decreed to be used "by all officials as the designation of the new Philippine peso to differentiate it from the $ mark for United States currency and the pesos of Spain..." This sign was chosen by Charles Edward Magoon, acting chief of the Bureau of Insular Affairs, and was approved by Governor William H. Taft.

Encoding 
The peso is usually denoted by the symbol "₱". This symbol was added to the Unicode standard in version 3.2 and is assigned  (₱). The symbol can be accessed through some word processors by typing in 20b1 and then pressing the  buttons simultaneously, or by pressing and holding , then pressing 8369 on the keypad. Other ways of writing the Philippine Peso sign are "PHP", "PhP", "P", or "P" (strike-through or double-strike-through uppercase P), which is still the most common method, although font support for the Unicode Peso sign has been around for some time.

The international three-letter currency code for the Philippine peso is PHP.

See also

 Economy of the Philippines
 Currency sign

References

External links
 Currency in the Philippines by Charles Arthur Conant
 Peso sign ₱

Currencies of the Philippines
Currency symbols
Numismatics